Serhiy Vitaliyovych Nadal (born 1 January 1975) is a Ukrainian politician. He is the mayor of Ternopil and head of the Ternopil United territorial community in western Ukraine. A member of the party All-Ukrainian Union "Svoboda", Nadal has been mayor since 2010. Nadal election in 2010 was the first mayoral election won by "Svoboda".

See also
 List of mayors of Ternopil

References

External links
 Official website 
 Biography on Ternpoil city website 

1975 births
Living people
Mayors of places in Ukraine
Politicians from Ternopil
Svoboda (political party) politicians
Ternopil National Economic University alumni
Ternopil urban hromada
Laureates of the Honorary Diploma of the Verkhovna Rada of Ukraine
Recipients of the Honorary Diploma of the Cabinet of Ministers of Ukraine